Statistics of Kuwaiti Premier League for the 2005–06 season. The bottom 6 teams of that season were relegated as the commencing season was the inaugurating season of the Kuwaiti second division.

Overview
It was contested by 14 teams, and Al Kuwait Kaifan won the championship.

League standings

References
Kuwait - List of final tables (RSSSF)

Kuwait Premier League seasons
1
Kuw